Adam Savić (born 15 July 1986) is a Bosnian handball player who plays as a goalkeeper for the Romanian club SCM Politehnica Timișoara and the Bosnia and Herzegovina national team.

References

1986 births
Living people
Bosnia and Herzegovina male handball players
Sportspeople from Tuzla
Bosnia and Herzegovina expatriate sportspeople in Spain
Bosnia and Herzegovina expatriate sportspeople in Romania
Expatriate handball players